Vienna International Airport is the international airport of Vienna, the capital of Austria, located in Schwechat,  southeast of central Vienna and  west of Bratislava, the capital of Slovakia. It is the country's largest airport and serves as the hub for Austrian Airlines as well as a base for low-cost carriers Wizz Air and Ryanair. It is capable of handling wide-body aircraft up to the Airbus A380. The airport features a dense network of European destinations as well as long-haul flights to Asia, North America and Africa. In 2020, the airport handled 7.8 million passengers, a 75.3% decrease compared to 2019 due to the collapse of air traffic during the COVID-19 pandemic.

History

Early years
Originally built as a military airport in 1938 and used during World War II as the Heinkel firm's southern military aircraft design and production complex, or Heinkel-Süd facility, it was taken over by the British in 1945 and became RAF Schwechat under the occupation of the country. In 1954, the Betriebsgesellschaft was founded, and the airport replaced Aspern Airfield as Vienna's (and Austria's) principal aerodrome. There was just one runway, which in 1959 was expanded to measure . The erection of the new airport building began in 1959.

In 1972, another runway was built. In 1982, the airport was connected to the national motorway network (Ostautobahn). In 1986, the enlarged arrivals hall was opened, and in 1988 Pier East with 8 jet bridges was opened.

On 27 December 1985, the El Al ticket counter was attacked by Abu Nidal, a Palestinian terrorist organization that simultaneously conducted a terrorist attack at Fiumicino Airport in Rome.

, one of the few publicly traded airport operators in Europe, was privatised in 1992. The state of Lower Austria and the City of Vienna each hold 20% of the shares, the private employee participation foundation holds 10%, with the remaining 50% held privately. The shares are part of the Austrian Traded Index.

In 1992, the new Terminal 1 was opened and a year later the shopping area around the plaza in the transit area of the B, C and D gates was opened. In 1996, Pier West with 12 jetbridges became operational.

Development since the 2000s
It allows a free overview of the entire airport area and offers a night laser show, which aims to welcome the passengers even from the aircraft. From 2004 to 2007, an Office Park had been erected offering  of rentable space. A VIP- and general aviation-terminal, including a separated apron, opened in 2006.

To accommodate future growth, in 1998 Vienna Airport published a master plan that outlined expansion projects until 2015. These projects included a new office park, railway station, cargo center, general aviation center, air traffic control tower, terminal, and runway. Additionally, the plan called for streamlined security control. The centerpiece of the enlargement was the new terminal, dubbed Skylink during its construction. In 2002, the airport's management estimated that building the new terminal will cost €401.79 million. However, costs skyrocketed and in 2009 stood at an estimated €929.5 million. The Austrian Court of Audit then recommended that the airport implement several cost-savings measures, which in the Court's estimate brought down final costs to €849.15 million, still more than double the original plans.

On June 5, 2012, the new Austrian Star Alliance Terminal (Terminal 3, named Skylink during its construction) was opened, which enables the airport to handle up to 30 million passengers per year. Construction started in 2004 and was suspended due to projected cost increases in 2009, but resumed in 2010. The maximum planned costs totaled less than €770 million. Following concerns over the mismanagement of the Skylink project, chief executive Herbert Kaufman agreed to resign at the end of December 2010. The new building with its North Pier has 17 jetbridges and makes the airport capable of handling more aircraft, although the new terminal is not able to handle Airbus A380 aircraft. However, the older Concourse D will see an upgrade to accommodate the A380.

Terminals

The airport has four terminal buildings named Terminal 1, 2 and 3 which are directly built against each other as well as the additional Terminal 1A located opposite Terminal 1. Terminals 1, 2 and 3 connect to the five concourses. The central arrivals hall for all terminal areas is located in Terminal 3.

Terminals
Terminal 1 underwent refurbishment in January 2013 and is now mainly used by some Oneworld and SkyTeam airlines along with Turkish Airlines, Ryanair and Wizz Air.
Terminal 1A, located in a standalone building opposite Terminal 1. It hosted check-in facilities for a number of low-cost carriers, but remains closed since the start of the COVID-19 pandemic.
Terminal 2 was refurbished between 2016 and late 2021 and now features new security screening areas and a revamped baggage reclaim.
Terminal 3, also referred to as the Austrian Star Alliance Terminal, with its adjoining Concourses F and G is the airport's newest facility. It is used by Austrian Airlines, most Star Alliance members, and a number of other carriers including Emirates, El Al, Korean Air, Royal Jordanian and Qatar Airways. A planned expansion has been postponed indefinitely.

Concourses
Concourse B is in the basement of Concourse C and features Gates B31–B42 (boarding by buses) for Schengen destinations. Since 2021 it is temporarily used to handle non-Schengen bus arrivals. In 2022 it has been refurbished to assume that role permanently.
Concourse C (pier west) for Schengen destinations; features Gates C21-24) (boarding via buses), C31–C42 (jetbridges) C71–C75 (boarding via buses)
Concourse D (pier east; formerly Concourse A) for non-Schengen destinations with shared passport control at the entrance of pier east; features Gates D21–D29 (boarding via jetbridges), D31–D37 (boarding via buses), D61–D70 (buses).
Concourse F (Level 1 of pier north) is used for Schengen destinations and consists of Gates F01-F37 (jetbridges and buses)
Concourse G (Level 3 and basement of pier north) for non-Schengen destinations; shared passport control at the entrance of Level 3; features Gates G01-G37 (jetbridges and bus gates) and G61-67 (boarding via buses).

Expansion projects

Third runway
Vienna Airport originally projected that it would need a third runway by 2012, or 2016 at the latest, in the event of cooperation with nearby Bratislava Airport. The third runway is planned to be parallel to and south of the existing runway 11/29. It will be designated 11R/29L, with the existing runway being renamed 11L/29R. The new runway is planned to be 3680 m long and 60 m wide, and equipped with a category III instrument landing system in one direction (29L).

The airport projected that a third runway will be necessary by 2025 prior to the COVID-19 pandemic, however, environmental organizations and some local communities oppose construction. These groups have attacked the decision of Lower Austria (the state in which the airport is located) to move ahead with the first phase of construction; verdict from the administrative court that has taken up the lawsuit was expected later in 2015. As of September 2016, there were ongoing public protests while no legal decision had been made. On 28 March 2018, the Austrian Federal Administrative Court ruled in favour of a third runway.

Terminal expansions and refurbishments
In July 2019, the refurbishment of Terminal 2 started and reopened in 2022. Concourse D has been closed and partially refurbished during the COVID-19 pandemic. In addition to that, a completely new building was supposed to be built which is supposed to connect the existing pier east and pier north. The so-called T3 Southern Enlargement will be offering 70,000 m2 (750,000 sq ft) of leisure area and new additional bus gates. The opening had been planned for 2023, however the project had been delayed in the wake of the COVID-19 pandemic. In January 2023 it was announced that the construction of the new building is now set to start in mid 2023 and scheduled to open in 2027.

Airlines and destinations

Passenger
The following airlines offer regular scheduled and charter flights at Vienna International Airport:

Cargo

Statistics

Traffic figures

Busiest routes

Ground transportation

Train

The Vienna S-Bahn line S7 provides a local service to the city centre taking approx. 25 minutes. The more expensive City Airport Train connects the airport directly to Wien Mitte railway station, close to the city centre, in 16 minutes.

Additionally, the underground railway station has been expanded to accommodate long-distance trains. Since December 2014, the first trains passing Vienna's new main station, ICE services from Germany, terminate at the airport. Since December 2015, ÖBB Railjet services operate to the airport as well. Long-distance train rides between the airport and the main station take approx. 15 minutes.

Car
The airport lies directly adjacent to motorway A4 which leads from central Vienna to Budapest. It has its own exit named Flughafen Wien-Schwechat. Bratislava can be reached via motorway A6 which splits from the A4 in the east. Taxis and car rental facilities are available at the airport. There are also several taxi companies that operate at the airport.

Bus
Buses operate from the airport to various places in Vienna and to other cities including Bratislava, Budapest and Brno.

Accidents and incidents
 In 1955, a Convair CV-340 crashed on approach to the airport, killing 7 of the 29 passengers and crew on board. This is the last fatal aviation accident to occur at Wien-Schwechat Airport.
 On 27 December 1985, 1985 Rome and Vienna airport attacks
 On 12 July 2000, Hapag-Lloyd Flight 3378 crashed short of the runway at the airport on the final approach of its diverted flight due to fuel exhaustion. There were no fatalities, but the aircraft was damaged beyond repair.

See also
 Transport in Austria
 List of airports in Austria

References

External links

 
 
 

Airports in Lower Austria
Airports established in 1938
Buildings and structures in Lower Austria
International airports in Austria
Schwechat
Transport in Vienna
Wien-Umgebung District